Ghatotkacha (literally: "Bald Pot") is a prominent character in the story of Mahabharata. His name comes from the fact that his head was hairless (utkacha) and shaped like a ghatam, or a pot. Ghatotkacha was the son of the Pandava Bhima and the demoness Hidimbi, and thus a half-human, half-demon hybrid.

He is the father of Anjanaparvan, Barbarika and Meghavarna. He was an important fighter from the Pandava side in the Kurukshetra war and caused a great deal of destruction to the Kaurava army. Ghatotkacha killed many demons like Alambusha, Alayudha, and many gigantic Asuras. He was specifically called out as the warrior who forced Karna to use his Vasavi Shakti weapon, and courted a hero’s death in the great war.

Birth and the Legends

On the burning of the 'Lakshagriha', the Pandavas escape through a tunnel and reached a forest. While they were sleeping the demon chief Hidimba in the forest sees the Pandavas from the top of a tree, and he appoints his sister Hidimbi to bring them to him for food.

Hidimbi goes to the Pandavas in the guise of a beautiful woman. She is attracted to Bhima and prays for the return of her love. She alerts the Pandavas to her brother's demands, pleading with them to leave the forest; however, Bhima refuses. Impatient at the delay, Hidimba runs towards the Pandavas but is slain by Bhima.

Hidimbi then approaches Kunti and requests Bhima's hand in marriage. The Pandavas agree to the proposal on the condition that once a child is born to Hidimbi, they'd have to continue their peregrinations. Later, Ghatotkacha is born to Hidimbi and Bhima. Indra bestows on Ghaṭotkacha prowess enough to be a suitable opponent to Karna. 

Ghatotkacha grows up under the care of Hidimbi. Like his father, Ghatotkacha's weapon of choice is the mace. 

According to folktales,  Ghatotkacha marries Ahilawati and their sons are Barbarika, Anjanaparva, and Meghavarna.

Hidimbi's Sacrifice Request 
According to folktales, years later, one day Hidimbi asks Ghatotkacha to fetch a human to sacrifice to Kali. On his way to do so, he spots a Brahmin and his wife traveling with their three children. Ghatotkacha approaches them and requests one of them to come with him to be his mother's sacrifice to the goddess.

The Brahmin offers himself, but his wife insists that she would go. Finally, their second son agrees to go with Ghatotkacha but asks to first bathe in the river Ganga. Bhima, living in exile in the forest with his brothers, comes across the scene. Upon discovering the pending sacrifice, he steps in to take the child's place. Ghatotkacha returns to his mother with Bhima in tow, only to become shocked when she tells him that Bhima is his father. Scolded by Bhima, both Ghatotkacha and Hidimbi agree to end the practice of human sacrifice.

Interactions with Bhima 
During their exile in the forest the Pandavas were too tired to walk further, then Bhima remembers Ghatotkacha, who immediately appeared before the Pandavas, and also brought down many demons at the behest of Bhima. Ghatotkach carrying Panchali on his shoulders, and the demons carrying Pandava brothers on their shoulders went by air to Badrikashrama, where Naranarayana was meditating, landed him there, and then he (Ghatotkach and his companions) bid farewell to the Pandavas.

Kurukshetra War 

In the Kurukshetra War, Ghatotkacha is summoned by Bhima to fight on the Pandava side. In the battle of the first day he fought against Alambusha, Duryodhana, and Bhagadatta. Terrified of the terrible course of the battle, the Kauravas deliberately postponed the battle for that day.
On the 8th day of battle, Ghatotkacha has a prolonged clash with Alambusha, and though he manages to severely wound the other demon, he is unable to prevent his retreat.

The 14th day of battle features Ghatotkacha in a major role. During the morning battle, he becomes enraged when Anjanaparvan is killed by Ashwatthama. Invoking his magical powers, he brings great havoc to the Kaurava army using his power of illusion, even scaring away warriors like Duryodhana and Karna. Ashwatthama attempts to rally fleeing soldiers, dispelling Ghatotkacha's illusion and managing to knock the demon unconscious. After coming to his senses, Ghatotkacha fights with Ashwatthama in a long duel. During the fight, both combatants use their celestial weapons, though Ashwatthama manages to hold his ground and forces Ghatotkacha to withdraw.

After the death of Jayadratha, with the battle continuing past sunset, Ghatotkacha truly shines; his powers were at their most effective at night as demons' abilities are heightened. Along with his troops, Ghatotkacha kills Alayudha and Alambusha, smashing the latter's head with a mace. With Ghatotkacha on a rampage, Drona is forced to finally end the day's fighting.

On the 15th day, a fight took place between Karna and Ghatotkacha. Karna manages to defeat Ghatotkacha multiple times, but Ghatotkacha manages to escape using his illusions. Karna is unable to prevent Ghatotkacha from wreaking havoc on the Kaurava army, and even many of his celestial weapons are rendered useless. As the army breaks around him, with even Duryodhana forced to flee with his flag in tatters, Karna uses Vasavi Śhakti as a last resort. This weapon had been bestowed by Indra and could only be used once; Karṇa had been keeping it in reserve to use against Arjuna.

Mortally wounded by the Śakti, Ghatotkacha rises to the sky and manages to enlarge his body, crushing one akshauhini of the Kaurava army. The Pandavas were filled with grief at Ghatotkacha's death. Krishna, however, couldn't help but smile, knowing that Ghatotkacha has saved Arjuna from Karna.

Indonesian version

The Kurukshetra War in Javanese and also Balinese wayang is usually called by the name Bharatayuddha. The story was adapted and developed from the script Kakawin Bharatayuddha written in 1157 during the time of the Kediri Kingdom (present day East Java, Indonesia). In the wayang puppet version, Ghatotkacha (locally spelled 'Gatotkaca') is very close to his cousin named Abhimanyu, son of Arjuna. Abhimanyu married Uttara the daughter of Virata Kingdom, after he claimed he was a virgin. In fact, Abhimanyu was married to Sitisundari, daughter of Krishna. Sitisundari who is entrusted in the palace of Ghatotkacha heard the news that her husband had remarried. Ghatotkacha's Uncle, named Kalabendana, came to Abhimanyu to take him home (Kalabendana was Arimbi's youngest brother, a dwarf giant but with a plain and noble heart). This had made Uttara jealous, and Abhimanyu was forced to swear that if he indeed had a wife other than Uttara, he would be willing to die beaten by his enemies later on. Kalabendana met with Ghatotkacha to report Abhimanyu's attitude. Ghatotkacha actually scolded Kalabendana, which he considered presumptuously interfering in his cousin's household affairs. Out of impulse anger, Ghatotkacha hit Kalabendana's head, and even though the act was carried out accidentally, Kalabendana was killed instantly.

When the Bharatayuddha war broke out, Abhimanyu was actually killed by the Kauravas on the 13th day. On the 14th day, Arjuna managed to avenge his son's death by beheading Jayadratha. Duryodhana was very sad over the death of Jayadratha, his own brother-in-law. He forced Karna to attack the Pandava camp that night. Karna obeyed even though this violates the rules of the war. After learning that the Kauravas launched a night attack, the Pandavas sent Ghatotkacha to head off. Ghatotkacha was deliberately chosen because Kotang Antrakusuma armor which he wears is able to emit bright light to shine on Kaurava's army. Ghatotkacha successfully killed a Kaurava ally named Lembusa. Meanwhile, two of his uncles, Brajalamadan and Brajawikalpa, died at the hands of their enemies, each named Lembusura and Lembusana.

Ghatotkacha faced Karna, the wielder of Kontawijaya weapon. He created his twins as many as a thousand people to make Karna feel confused. On the instructions of his father, named Surya, Karna managed to find the original Ghatotkacha. He then released Konta weapon in the direction of Ghatotkacha. Ghatotkacha tried to evade this by flying as high as possible. But the spirit of Kalabendana suddenly appeared to catch Kontawijaya while delivering news from heaven that the death of Ghatotkacha had been set that night. Ghatotkacha surrenders himself to his fate and requests that his body would be used to kill Kaurava's armies. Kalabendana agrees, then stabbed Ghatotkacha's navel using Konta weapon. The weapon merges back into its sheath, which is the mastaba wood still stored in Ghatotkacha's gut. Ghatotkacha dies, and the spirit of Kalabendana threw his body towards Karna which managed to jump to escape death. Karna's chariot was shattered to pieces as a result of being crushed by Ghatotkacha's body, and the fragments of the chariot shot in all directions and killed the Kaurava soldiers who were around it.

Lineage
Ghatotkacha had 3 sons - Barbarika, Anjanaparvan and Meghavarna. The existence of Barbarika is debated as he is mentioned in the later additions to the Skanda Purana, and not in the official renditions of the Mahabharata.

However, Ghatotkacha's Lineage is supposed to have extended longer. The royal family of the Dimasa Kingdom claimed descent from Ghatotkacha.

Temples

 There is a temple built in Champawat, Uttrakhand where it is meant his head fell after he was killed by Karna in the battle of Mahabharata.
 There is a temple built to honor Ghatotkacha in Manali, Himachal Pradesh near the Hidimba Devi Temple.
 An ancient 7th Century Hindu temple structure in Dieng Temples complex, Central Java is named as "Ghatotkacha Temple" in honour of the Mahabharata character.

In popular culture
The folktale of Sasirekha Parinayam (not originally in the Mahabharata) about Abhimanyu's love for Shashirekha/Vatsala (the daughter of Balarama) and Ghatotkacha's help in breaking off Vatsala's engagement with Laxmana Kumar has been filmed numerous times in India. These include:
 Surekha Haran, a 1921 Indian silent film directed by Baburao Painter.
 Vatsalaharan, a 1923 Indian silent film directed by Baburao Painter.
 Maya Bazaar, a 1925 Indian silent film directed by Baburao Painter.
 Maya Bazaar, a 1932 Indian Hindi film starring Baburao Pendharkar.
 Maya Bazaar, a 1935 Indian Tamil film directed by R. Padmanabhan.
 Mayabazar, or Sasirekha Parinayam, a 1936 Indian Telugu-language fantasy film directed by P. V. Das.
 Maya Bazaar, a 1939 Indian film directed by G. P. Pawar.
 Maya Bazaar, a 1949 Indian Hindi fantasy film directed by Datta Dharmadhikari.
 Mayabazar, a 1957 Indian epic fantasy film directed by K. V. Reddy.
 Maya Bazaar, a 1958 Indian Hindi adventure fantasy film directed by Babubhai Mistry.
 Maya Bazar, a 1984 Indian Hindi/Gujarati fantasy film directed by Babubhai Mistry.
 Maya Bazaar, a 1984 Indian Telugu romance drama film directed by Dasari Narayana Rao.
 Other Indian films about Ghatotkacha include:
 Veer Ghatotkach, a 1949 Indian Hindi/Marathi mythological film.
 Veer Ghatotkajan, a 1959 Indian Tamil mythological film directed by Babubhai Mistry.
 Ghatotkachudu, a 1995 Indian Telugu comedy film directed by S. V. Krishna Reddy.
 Veer Ghatotkach, a 1970 Indian Hindi mythological adventure film directed by Shantilal Soni.
 A 2008 Indian animated film Ghatothkach was based on his life. It was directed by Singeetham Srinivas Rao.
 Ghatotkacha, another Indian animated film released in 2008, directed by Rakesh Prasad.
 Amar Chitra Katha, an Indian comic book series, published an issue on Ghatotkacha. This was later adapted as an episode in the 2010 animated series of the comics.
 Razaq Khan (Not comedian Rajaq Khan) played Ghatotkacha in 1988 TV Series Mahabharat.
 Ketan Karande played Ghatotkacha in 2013 TV Series Mahabharat.
 Since ancient until current modern Indonesia, Ghatotkacha has become a very popular pop culture figure and wayang puppet character, having its own version of stories told in the Javanese and Balinese version of Mahabharata story.
 In Javanese wayang, he is known as Gatotkoco with superhero fame and well known for the nickname the "Satria otot kawat balung wesi" ("Wire muscle and Iron bone Warrior").
 For Javanese and Balinese, Ghatotkacha is revered as a deity and popularly depicted in artworks and statues, such as the Satria Gatotkaca Park Statue in Kuta major road intersection in Bali.
 Ghatotkacha has been frequently depicted in Indonesian popular culture, such as music, comics and film, such as the superhero action film Satria Dewa: Gatotkaca (2021).
 Javanese version of Ghatotkacha, known as Gatotkaca, depicted in Garudayana, an Indonesian comic series, is featured as a playable character in the game Mobile Legends: Bang Bang.

See also
 Ghatotkacha Caves
 Hanuman
 Mayabazar
 Kachari Kingdom

References

External links

 Mahābhārata Book 7 Ghatotkacha-vadha Parva

Rakshasa in the Mahabharata 
Asura
Rakshasa
Characters in the Mahabharata